George Odwell (15 February 1911 – 11 July 1995) was a British professional boxer who was active from 1930 to 1945 and boxed in the welterweight division. He fought a recorded 210 times in his 15 year-career and is currently ranked 7th on the boxers with the most knockouts.

Career
Odwell began his career in 1930 with a match against Tom Daniels which Odwell won by knockout victory in the 3rd round.

Odwell defeated Jack Kid Berg on 1 November 1937 by technical knockout in the 7th round of a 12-round bout.

Odwell has been ranked as one of Britain's top 500 fighters.

Odwell died on 11 July 1995.

References

External links

1911 births
1995 deaths
Boxers from Greater London
Welterweight boxers
British male boxers